Capilla del Cristo (Chapel of Christ), also called  is a small chapel / museum located in the Old San Juan Historic District of Puerto Rico. Built in the 18th century and saved from demolition in the 20th century, the structure has become a cultural icon of Puerto Rico. Most of the articles located at its altar are from 1753. Travel guides list  as one of the must-see places of Old San Juan.

Cultural significance

Images of the chapel's facade are quite popular, and sometimes featured on the covers of Puerto Rican travel guides as well as on canvas prints, posters, and mug souvenirs.

Inside the chapel are paintings by Jose Campeche and a painting by Jorge Sen called  (English: The Miracle). Its altar is made of silver and gold.

The St. Juan and St. Peter races, is an annual festival that's taken place on Cristo Street near Capilla del Cristo since before the mid 19th century.

Location
Capilla del Cristo is located at the end of Cristo Street in the Historic District of Old San Juan near La Fortaleza, the official residence of the governor of Puerto Rico.

Architecture
It's a one-story-high, brick and stone structure with a curved belfry atop. Its gate was added in the 1940s for the protection of its interior. Built in the Spanish Baroque style, Juan Francisco Metre is credited with its design. The building has been kept in good condition by the volunteer group Cristo de la Salud Brotherhood.

Folklore
Religious folklore, particularly among Catholics, said that during a horse race on La Calle de Cristo, a young rider and his horse took a bad fall. The rider went over the precipice but was miraculously saved. 

The chapel was built where the fateful race was said to have occurred in honor of the young rider named Baltazar Montañez. It has become both a tourist attraction as well as a stop for religious pilgrims, who occasionally leave a religious votive at the chapel. It is only open on Tuesdays. 

Different versions of the legend mention that either the rider or Tomas Mateo Pratts, an observer yelled for divine intervention. In a book about Puerto Rican legends, José Ramirez-Rivera writes that the horse was killed but Baltazar lived. Afterwards, permission was granted to build the Catholic chapel and festivals were held for years afterward to celebrate the miracle.

In his writings about Baltazar, Puerto Rican historian Cayetano Coll y Toste described him as a slave who worked in the sugar cane fields of Puerto Rico but made no mention of the legendary accident.

Gallery

See also

 Irish immigration to Puerto Rico

References

External links

 Location of Capilla del Cristo on map of Old San Juan
 History of the chapel on a Catholic channel on YouTube
 Harmonica music played outside of 

Buildings and structures in San Juan, Puerto Rico
History of San Juan, Puerto Rico
Tourist attractions in San Juan, Puerto Rico